Pomona High School is a public secondary school operated by Jefferson County School District R-1 in Arvada, Colorado, United States.

History

Pomona High School was built in 1973. Located in Arvada, and a part of the Jefferson County Public School district, the school has also been said to be named for the area which was once named the Pomona Ranch. The original farm house for the Pomona Ranch was located at the current spot of McDonald's at the corner of 80th Avenue and Wadsworth Boulevard

The building went through a reconstruction, adding a two-story section in 1994 and 1995, which currently houses the Social Studies and World Language departments. At present, the only part of the school that has remained in the same spot is the gym, although the floor and bleachers were redone in 2008.

In 2015, Dr. Tom Bindel, chemistry teacher at the school, was named Colorado’s Outstanding High School Physical Science Teacher by the Colorado Association of Science Teachers.

Pomona's most successful interscholastic sport is wrestling, where they have won nine 5A state championships.  Following the longtime success of coach Tom Beeson, who retired in 2002, current coach Sam Federico won four straight 5A titles between 2019 and 2022.  The 2022 squad broke the all-time record for most points in the state championship tournament when they scored 256.5 points.  

In the 2009–10 academic year the football team took second place in the 5A state championship game, losing to Mullen High School. The team finished the season with a 12–2 record. In 2017–18 academic year the football team took first place in the 5A state championship game.

In 2010, the Catwalk Theatre Company's production of The Servant of Two Masters was presented at the 46th Annual Colorado State Thespian Conference.

Students
Demographics (2020):
White: 56%
Hispanic: 36%
Two or more races: 4%
Asian: 2%
Native American: 1%
Black: 1%

Student activities

Athletics
State championships:
Baseball: 2003 (5A)
Golf: Jakob Green (1985), Grant Olinger (2014)
Wrestling: 2000 (5A), 2001 (5A), 2013 (5A), 2016 (5A), 2017 (5A), 2019 (5A), 2020 (5A), 2021 (5A), 2022 (5A), 2023 (5A)
Football: 1988, 2017 (5A)
Girls' gymnastics: 2015 (5A), 2016 (5A), 2017 (5A) 2018 (5A) 2019 (5A)
Boys' track: 2016 (5A)

Varsity sports:
Football
Baseball
Soccer
Wrestling
Basketball
Tennis
Golf
Swimming
Cross country
Track
Softball (for women only)
Gymnastics (for women only)
Volleyball (for women only)

Arts
The Pomona Band offers three concert bands, marching band, two jazz ensembles, winter guard, winter percussion ensemble and orchestra. The marching band has won 11 marching band state championships in class 5A from 1994 through 2005, appeared in the Tournament of Roses Parade in 1996 and 2005, and placed 5th in the 1996 BOA National Championships. The band also placed 11th in the 1997 BOA National Championships, and 14th in the 2003 BOA National Championships.

The Pomona Winter Guard and Percussion Ensemble were the 2004 Winter Guard International World Finalist. The Winter Guard took first place at the 1994 and 1999 WGI national competitions.  The Winter Percussion ensemble took third place at the 1999 WGI competition in Open Class and second place in the 2000 Open Class Competition. The Pomona Symphonic Band was a 2000, 2003 and 2006 Colorado Music Educator's Association (CMEA) Honor Band.

Notable alumni

 Patrick Cain, football player
 Max Borghi, football player in the XFL
 Taylor Marie Hill, model
 Joel Klatt, Fox Sports Network analyst and host
 Nick Stabile, actor who appeared on Saints and Sinners
 Eme Ikwuakor, Class of 2002, actor who is currently in Marvel Inhumans
 Cory Blaser, Umpire Major League Baseball
Brian Schneider, NFL Coordinator

References

External links
 

Public high schools in Colorado
Educational institutions established in 1973
Jefferson County Public Schools (Colorado)
Buildings and structures in Arvada, Colorado
Schools in Jefferson County, Colorado
1973 establishments in Colorado